Dihammaphora meissneri' is a species of beetle in the family Cerambycidae. It was described by Melzer in 1934.

References

Dihammaphora
Beetles described in 1934